Saraswati Vidya Mandir, Barabanki is a Hindi medium co-educational school affiliated to the Uttar Pradesh Board of High School and Intermediate Education. This is one of the schools run by the Vidya Bharati Akhil Bharatiya Shiksha Sansthan, a non-governmental organisation. Within a short span of time the school has distinguished itself in the field of education because of the success of its students in board examinations, competitive examinations as well as in the various cultural and sports activities.

The school motto is "Siksharth Aaiye, Sevarth Jaiye" (Come To Learn, Go to Serve).

See also
 Vidya Bharati
 Uttar Pradesh Madhyamik Shiksha Parishad

References

External links
 Facebook Page of Saraswati Vidya Mandir Barabanki

Vidya Bharati schools
Intermediate colleges in Uttar Pradesh
Schools in Barabanki, Uttar Pradesh
Educational institutions established in 1992
1992 establishments in Uttar Pradesh